Anant Shet (1960/1961 – 2 August 2020) was an Indian politician and member of the Bharatiya Janata Party. He was a member of the Goa Legislative Assembly.

Anant Shet died on 2 August 2020, aged 59.

Posts
Anant Shet was elected Speaker of the Goa Legislative Assembly in 2016.

Constituency
He represented the Maem constituency of Goa.

Goa Legislative Assembly
 Term 2007–2017.

References 

Bharatiya Janata Party politicians from Goa
Members of the Goa Legislative Assembly
1960s births
2020 deaths
Speakers of the Goa Legislative Assembly
People from North Goa district
Year of birth missing